Mia Khalifa (born 1993) is an American media personality, webcam model, and former pornographic actress.
 
Mia Khalifa may also refer to:
 "Mia Khalifa" (song), a 2018 song by iLoveFriday